The Advance Bi Beta (sometimes written as BiBeta) is a tandem two-place paraglider, designed and produced by Advance Thun of Thun, Switzerland.

Design and development
The Beta was designed as a two-place flight training glider for introducing new student pilots to the sport.

The Beta has undergone continuous development, starting with the original Beta, through the Beta 2, 3, 4 and 5 models.

Variants
Bi Beta
Tandem two place glider, initial model.
Bi Beta 2/3
Tandem two place glider sold in the mid-2000s.
Bi Beta 4
Tandem two place glider sold in the late-2000s.
BiBeta 5
Tandem two place glider sold in the mid-2010s.

Specifications (BiBeta 5)

References

External links

Beta
Paragliders